The Cacica mine is a large salt mine located in northern Romania in Suceava County, close to Cacica. Cacica represents one of the largest salt reserves in Romania having estimated reserves of 238 million tonnes of NaCl.

External links
 One day in Cacica - Salt Mine Chapel, YouTube HD
 One day in Cacica - Salt Mine, YouTube HD

References 

Salt mines in Romania